Mohamed Moussa (born August 16, 1995) is an Egyptian professional footballer who plays as a goalkeeper for El-Entag El-Harby. He was also a player for Egypt national under-23 team. In 2015, Moussa signed a 4-year contract for El-Entag, moving from Wadi Degla and Al Ahly Fc before it (2010-2011).

References 

1985 births
Living people
Egyptian footballers
Association football goalkeepers
Egyptian Premier League players
Wadi Degla SC players
El Entag El Harby SC players